Tom Marlowe may refer to:

Tom Marlowe, winner of the 1963 Pacific Northwest PGA Championship
Tom Marlowe, a character in Good News (musical)
Tom Marlowe, a character in Six Days, Seven Nights
Tom Marlowe, a character from an eponymous series of books by Chris Priestley

See also
Thomas Marlow, English cricketer